George Brown's Sons Cotton and Woolen Mill, now known as the Sassafras Alley Apartments, is an historic mill complex which is located in Mount Joy, Lancaster County, Pennsylvania. 

It was listed on the National Register of Historic Places in 1995.

History and architectural features
This complex includes nine contributing buildings. They are identified as Building A through Building I, and date from the early nineteenth century to 1916. The buildings were converted to apartments between 1988 and 1991.

It was listed on the National Register of Historic Places in 1995.

References

Industrial buildings and structures on the National Register of Historic Places in Pennsylvania
Buildings and structures in Lancaster County, Pennsylvania
National Register of Historic Places in Lancaster County, Pennsylvania